Neuroplastin is a protein that in humans is encoded by the NPTN gene.

Neuroplastin is a type I transmembrane protein belonging to the Ig superfamily. The protein is believed to be involved in cell-cell interactions or cell-substrate interactions. The alpha and beta transcripts show differential localization within the brain.

In 2014, in a study led by Dr. Sylvane Desrivières, of King's College London's Institute of Psychiatry found that "teenagers who had a highly functioning NPTN gene performed better in intelligence tests"

References

Further reading

Behavioural genetics